The Humboldt cutthroat trout (Oncorhynchus clarkii humboldtensis) is a subspecies of cutthroat trout, a North American fish in the family Salmonidae. It is one of the several subspecies of cutthroat trout. It was formally scientifically named in 2008 by Trotter and Behnke, who stated its distribution is in the basins of the upper Humboldt River of northern Nevada, the Upper Quinn River (Nevada and Oregon), as well as the Whitehorse (Coyote) basin (Oregon).  The Nevada and Oregon Fish and Wildlife authorities still consider these populations belonging to the subspecies O. c. henshawi (the Lahontan cutthroat trout).

References

Further reading
 

Humboldt cutthroat trout
Cold water fish
Freshwater fish of the United States
Fish of the Western United States
Fauna of the Great Basin
Natural history of Nevada
Natural history of Oregon
Humboldtcutthroat trout